Nedelino is a town and municipality in the Rhodope Mountains of the Smolyan Province, southern Bulgaria. The former name of Nedelino was Uzundere (until 1934), which means "Long Creek".

References 

Towns in Bulgaria
Cities and towns in the Rhodopes
Populated places in Smolyan Province